A.B. Original is an Australian hip hop duo made up of Indigenous Australian rappers Briggs and record producer Trials. A.B. Original stands for Always Black, Original. Both members are Indigenous Australians; Briggs is a Yorta Yorta man and Trials is Ngarrindjeri. Their music is overtly political and has been described as "angry, polemical, brutally frank and meant to inspire a response, good or bad".

A.B. Original's single "January 26" (featuring Dan Sultan), released in August 2016, which comments on the use of that date for Australia Day. This was followed up by an album entitled Reclaim Australia in November. The provocatively titled album features many guests including Thelma Plum, G. Yunupingu and Archie Roach. 

At the 2017 AIR independent Music Awards, the duo won five awards; Breakthrough Independent Artist of the Year, Best Independent Hip Hop Album, Best Independent Single, Best Independent Artist and Best Independent Album or EP. At the APRA Music Awards of 2018 the duo won Songwriter of the Year.

In August 2022, A.B. Original returned with "King Billy Cokebottle" their first new music in four years.

Band members
 Briggs
 Trials

Discography

Albums

Singles

Awards and nominations

AIR Awards
The Australian Independent Record Awards (commonly known informally as AIR Awards) is an annual awards night to recognise, promote and celebrate the success of Australia's Independent Music sector.

|-
| rowspan="5" | AIR Awards of 2017
| rowspan="2" | themselves 
| Independent Artist of the Year
| 
|-
| Breakthrough Independent Artist
| 
|-
| rowspan="2" |Reclaim Australia 
| Best Independent Album
| 
|- 
| Best Independent Hip Hop/Urban Album
| 
|-
| "January 26" (with Dan Sultan)
| Best Independent Single/EP
| 
|- 
| AIR Awards of 2019
| "Blaccout"
| Best Independent Single/EP
| 
|-

APRA Music Awards
The APRA Awards are presented annually from 1982 by the Australasian Performing Right Association (APRA), "honouring composers and songwriters".

! 
|-
| APRA Music Awards of 2018
| themselves
| Songwriter of the Year
| 
| 
|-
| APRA Music Awards of 2019
| "Blaccout" (Adam Briggs / Daniel Rankine)
| Song of the Year
| 
| 
|-

ARIA Music Awards
The ARIA Music Awards is an annual awards ceremony that recognises excellence, innovation, and achievement across all genres of the music of Australia.

|-
| rowspan="6"| 2017
| rowspan="5"| Reclaim Australia
| Album of the Year
| 
|-
| Best Group
| 
|-
| Best Urban Album
| 
|-
| Best Independent Release
| 
|-
| Breakthrough Artist
| 
|-
| Daniel Rankine for Reclaim Australia
| Producer of the Year
| 
|-

Australian Music Prize
The Australian Music Prize (the AMP) is an annual award of $30,000 given to an Australian band or solo artist in recognition of the merit of an album released during the year of award. The commenced in 2005.

|-
| 2016
| Reclaim Australia
| Australian Music Prize
| 
|-

J Award
The J Awards are an annual series of Australian music awards that were established by the Australian Broadcasting Corporation's youth-focused radio station Triple J. They commenced in 2005.

|-
| rowspan="2"| J Awards of 2017
| Reclaim Australia
| Australian Album of the Year
| 
|-
| "Report to the Mist"
| Australian Video of the Year
| 
|-

Music Victoria Awards
The Music Victoria Awards, are an annual awards night celebrating Victorian music. They commenced in 2005.

|-
| rowspan="6"| 2017
| rowspan="3"| themselves
| Best Band
| 
|-
| Best Live Act
| 
|-
| Best Aboriginal Act
| 
|-
| rowspan="2"| Reclaim Australia
| Best Album
| 
|-
| Best Hip Hop Album
| 
|-
| "January 26"
| Best Song
| 
|-

National Indigenous Music Awards
The National Indigenous Music Awards recognise excellence, innovation and leadership among Aboriginal and Torres Strait Islander musicians from throughout Australia. They commenced in 2004.

|-
| rowspan="3"| 2016
| themselves
| New Talent of the Year
| 
|-
| "Dead in a Minute"
| rowspan="2"| Song of the Year
| 
|-
| "2 Black 2 Strong"
| 
|-
| rowspan="4"| 2017
| themselves
| Artist of the Year
| 
|-
| Reclaim Australia
| Album of the Year
| 
|-
| rowspan="2"| "January 26" 
| Song of the Year
| 
|-
| Film Clip of the Year
| 
|-
| 2018
| themselves
| Artist of the Year
| 
|-

National Live Music Awards
The National Live Music Awards (NLMAs) are a broad recognition of Australia's diverse live industry, celebrating the success of the Australian live scene. The awards commenced in 2016.

|-
| National Live Music Awards of 2016
| A.B. Original
| Live Hip Hop Act of the Year
| 
|-
| rowspan="2" | National Live Music Awards of 2017
| rowspan="2" |Themselves
| Live Hip Hop Act of the Year
| 
|-
| Best Live Act of the Year - People's Choice
| 
|-
| National Live Music Awards of 2018
| A.B. Original
| Live Hip Hop Act of the Year
| 
|-

South Australian Music Awards
The South Australian Music Awards (previously known as the Fowler's Live Music Awards) are annual awards that exist to recognise, promote and celebrate excellence in the South Australian contemporary music industry. They commenced in 2012.

 
|-
| 2016
| A.B. Original
| Best Aboriginal or Torres Strait Island Artist 
| 
|- 
| rowspan="5" | 2017
| rowspan="3" | A.B. Original
| Best Group
| 
|- 
| Best Aboriginal or Torres Strait Island Artist 
| 
|- 
| Most Popular Hip Hop Artist
| 
|- 
| rowspan="2" | "January 26" (featuring Dan Sultan)
| Best Song
| 
|- 
| Best Video
| 
|-
| 2018
| A.B. Original
| Best Aboriginal or Torres Strait Island Artist 
| 
|-

References

2016 establishments in Australia
ARIA Award winners
Australian hip hop groups
Australian musical duos
Bad Apples Music artists
Golden Era Records artists
Indigenous Australian musical groups
Musical groups established in 2016
South Australian musical groups